Cyphopelta is a genus of plant bugs in the family Miridae. There is one described species in Cyphopelta, C. modesta.

References

Further reading

 
 
 

Articles created by Qbugbot
Herdoniini